The horned screamer  (Anhima cornuta) is a member of a small family of birds, the Anhimidae, which occurs in wetlands of tropical South America. There are three screamer species, the other two being the southern screamer and the northern screamer in the genus Chauna. They are related to the  ducks, geese and swans, which are in the family Anatidae, but have bills looking more like those of game birds.

Taxonomy
Already known in the 17th century, the horned screamer was described in 1766 by the Swedish naturalist Carl Linnaeus in the twelfth edition of his Systema Naturae. He introduced the binomial name Palamedea cornuta. The horned screamer is now the only species placed in the genus Anhima that was introduced by the French zoologist Mathurin Jacques Brisson in 1760. The specific epithet cornuta is the Latin word for "horned". The German naturalist Georg Marcgrave had used the Latin name Anhima in 1648 for the horned screamer in his Historia naturalis Brasiliae. The name was from the word for the bird in the Tupi language of South America.

Description
The upperparts, head, and breast are black, with white speckles on the crown, throat and wing coverts. There is a long spiny structure projecting forward from the crown. This structure is unique among birds and is not derived from a feather but is a cornified structure that is loosely attached to the skull and grows continuously while often breaking at its tip. This gives this species its name. It has very long and lanky legs and three large toes in each. The belly and under wing coverts are white. It has two sharp spurs on its wings and feet which are only partially webbed.

Call
The horned screamer's call, as the name suggests, is a very loud and repetitive echoing sound. It is called "el clon-clon" in Ecuador because of this peculiar feature.

Distribution and habitat
The horned screamer is found in lowlands from Colombia, Venezuela, Brazil, Bolivia, Peru, Ecuador, French Guiana, Suriname, and Guyana. It has been possibly extirpated from Trinidad. Despite having declined locally, it remains widespread and is fairly common overall. Its range in Brazil appears to have expanded in recent years.

Behavior
Screamers, like most birds, tend to group together, but are for the most part semi-social. The existence of the screamer is rather sedentary. It lives in well-vegetated marshes and feeds on water plants.

Breeding
Its nest is a large pile of floating vegetation anchored in shallow water. Three olive-brown eggs are laid, and the young, like those of most Anseriformes, can run as soon as they are hatched.

As a symbol
The horned screamer is the official bird of both the Department of Arauca and the Municipality of Arauca in Colombia, as well as a symbol of the National Reserve of Churute in Ecuador. The department and its capital are named after the bird, which is called arauco or aruco in Spanish.

The bird appears in the arms of Tietê, Brazil.

Footnotes

References
Clements, James, (2007) The Clements Checklist of the Birds of the World, Cornell University Press, Ithaca
Hilty, Steven, L. (2003) Birds of Venezuela,

External links

Horned Screamer at Internet Bird Collection.

horned screamer
Birds of Colombia
Birds of Venezuela
Birds of the Guianas
Birds of the Amazon Basin
Birds of Brazil
Birds of Ecuador
horned screamer
horned screamer